Mahābrahmā (Tibetan: tshangs pa chen po; Chinese/Japanese: 大梵天 Daibonten; Sinhala: මහා බ්‍රහ්ම; Thai: มหาพรหฺมฺา), sometimes only called Brahma, is the ruler of the Brahma World (Brahmaloka) in the Buddhist cosmology. He is considered the protector of Buddhist teachings (Pali: Dhammapala; Sanskrit: Dharmapala). Mahabrahma is generally represented in Buddhist culture as a god with four faces and four arms like other Brahmas, and variants of him are found in different Buddhist cultures. The Mahābrahmā, or the Great Brahma, is mentioned in Digha Nikaya as the being who dwells in the upper heaven; a Buddhist student can join him for one kalpa (eon, Brahma-year in Buddhism) after successfully entering the first jhana in the form realm of Buddhist practice.

In many Buddhist Suttas/Sutras, Mahabrahma pays visit to the Buddha. In a 16th-century novel, Journey to the West, Sun Wukong takes the monk Tang Sanzang to the heaven of Brahmas to meet Mahabrahma, where the monk impresses the Brahmas with his lecture on the Lotus Sutra.

Mahabrahma with other notable brahmas are revered by Buddhists around the world. One can find statues of Mahabrahma in many Buddhist temples. Various temples like Erawan Shrine in Thailand are dedicated to Mahabrahma.

Miscontrued as the Creator of the world 

Buddhism is a religion which does not include the belief in a creator deity, or any eternal divine personal being. Buddhism assumes that the universe has no ultimate beginning to it, and thus sees no need for a creator God. Buddhist texts posits that deities such as Mahabrahma are misconstrued to be a creator. During the Vivartakalpa, a deity from Abhassara plane was reborn in the Mahabrahma plane, as many living beings forget about their past life, this too happened with the Mahabrahma, and being unaware of the above planes of existence, he felt alone. He longed for the presence of others. After some time, many other deities from the above planes were also reborn in those brahma planes, as his ministers and companions. Seeing this happen, he falsely believed himself to be their creator. This belief, states the Buddhist texts, was then shared by other deities. Eventually, however one of the deities died and was reborn as a human. Through meditation, he got the power to remember his previous life. He went on to teach what he remembered from his previous life in the lower heaven, that Mahabrahma was the creator of the universe. This teaching led to the widespread human belief in a creator god, according to the Pali Canon.

Cult of Phra Phrom 

Mahabrahma is called as Phra Phrom (from Sanskrit/Pali: Brahmā, ब्रह्मा) in Thailand. In Thai culture, he is regarded as the deity of good fortune and protection. As early as the 1980s, the popularity of the Erawan cult of Phra Phrom from its inceptions in Thailand spread, accompanied by faithful reproduction of the structure of the shrine and the image, among overseas Buddhists in other countries of Southeast Asia (Singapore, Indonesia and Malaysia), in Taiwan, and in China. The golden dome of the Government House of Thailand also contains a statue of Phra Phrom.

Gallery

See also 

 Śakra
 Maheśvara
 Buddhist cosmology
 Brahmajāla Sutta

References 

Buddhist gods
Buddhist deities